Richard Clinton may refer to:

Richard Clinton (cricketer), English cricketer
Richard Clinton (politician), North Carolina colonial politician